English musical duo Wham! released three studio albums (three in North America and Japan, two in all other territories), three compilation albums, four video albums, 12 music videos, 12 singles, two remix albums and one documentary video.

Albums

Studio albums

Compilation albums

Remix albums

Video albums

Singles

"Last Christmas" re-issue and re-entry positions

Videography

Music videos

Films

Notes

References

Discographies of British artists
Pop music group discographies